Esmée Simirioti (1884 – 10 October 1982) was a Greek tennis player, who won the women's singles event at the 1906 Intercalated Games in Athens, Greece. Her name is sometimes translated as Esme Simiriotis.

Career
Simirioti competed for Greece in the tennis events at the 1906 Intercalated Games in Athens, Greece. Simirioti won the Women's singles event, beating fellow Greek Sofia Marinou in the final.
She was the seventh youngest gold medallist at the games, at the age of 22 years and 116 days.

Simirioti later won the  singles event in 1910 and 1914, and came second in 1924. She also won the mixed doubles event in 1914, and the women's double event in 1924.

Personal life
Simirioti's mother descended from the family of Georgios Zariphis. Her brother Georgios Simiriotis also competed at the 1906 Intercalated Games in tennis. She died on 10 October 1982.

References

External links
 Sports Reference

Greek female tennis players
Medalists at the 1906 Intercalated Games
1884 births
1982 deaths
Tennis players at the 1906 Intercalated Games